Arab–Sasanian coinage is a modern term used to describe coins struck in the style of the coinage of the Iranian Sasanian Empire (224–651) after the Muslim conquest of Persia, on behalf of the Muslim governors of the early Islamic caliphates (7th–8th centuries). These coins, mostly silver dirhams but also copper coins, were struck in the historic Sasanian lands of Iraq and Iran, and continued to show the portrait of a bust of a Sasanian emperor as well as other non-Islamic motifs of Sasanian coins, alongside Arabic inscriptions.

See also
 Indo-Sasanian coinage
 Sasanian coinage of Sindh

References

Literature 
 
 
 
 

Rashidun Caliphate
Numismatics
Government of the Sasanian Empire
Coins of the medieval Islamic world
Government of the Abbasid Caliphate
Government of the Umayyad Caliphate